Roads in Armenia serve as the main transport network in Armenia. With an underdeveloped railway network, principally due to its difficult terrain, the road system is of vital importance for the development of the country. Its role is important both with national and international traffic.

Armenia is a member of the International Road Transport Union and the TIR Convention.

Highways of national importance
The first roads as we conceive them in a modern perception, appeared in Armenia in the 19th Century.

The main roads in the country are:

 Մ1 Yerevan - Ashtarak - Gyumri - Bavra.   Length: 
 Մ2 Yerevan - Ararat - Yeraskh - Kapan - Meghri - Kilit Border (.  Length: 
 Մ3 Margara - Ashtarak - Vanadzor - Dzoramut.  Length: 
 Մ4 Yerevan - Hrazdan - Sevan - Azatamut
Մ5 Yerevan - Armavir - Border crossing with Turkey (closed due to political reasons)
 Մ6 Vanadzor - Bagratashen
 Մ7 Vanadzor - Gyumri - Akhurik.
Մ8 Vanadzor - Dilijan
Մ9 Talin - Karakert - Bagaran
Մ10 Sevan - Martuni - Yeghegnadzor
Մ11 Martuni - Vardenis - (/, Partially concurrent with de jure ) - Drmbon 
Մ12 Goris - (/, concurrent with de jure  and partially with ) -Stepanakert
Մ13 Angeghakot - Nakhchivan AR border
Մ14 Tsovagyugh - Vardenis
Մ15 Yerevan bypass
Մ16 Haghtanak - Azatamut
 Մ17 Kapan - Shikahogh - Meghri

Highways of regional importance
These roads are a level below M level roads, and connect main highways to communities across the country.
There are 84 numbered roads of this class in the country. The letter by which these roads are numbered is "H". In total there are 1969 km roads of this class.

1 to 10
 Հ1  Balahovit - Jraber -Kaghsi - Hrazdan
 Հ2 Abovyan - Arzni - Nor Geghi
 Հ3 Yerevan - Garni - Geghard
 Հ4 Yerevan - Yeghvard - Aragyugh - Hartavan
 Հ5 Nor Geghi - Argel - Arzakan ( - Aghveran) - Hrazdan
 Հ6 Abovyan - Nor Geghi - Yeghvard - Nor Yerznka
 Հ7 Karenis - Charentsavan - Fantan
 Հ8 Ayntap - Berkanush -  Artashat - Vosketap - Aygavan - Ararat
 Հ9 Berkanush - Dvin
 Հ10 Vosketap - Vedi - Lanjar

11 to 20
 Հ11 Pokr Vedi - Lusarat ( - Khor Virap) - Yeghegnavan - Ararat
 Հ12 Ayntap - Masis - Ranchpar - Araks - Jrarat
 Հ13 Vagharshapat - Masis - Marmarashen
 Հ14 Yerevan (Charbakh Metro) - Masis
 Հ15 Armavir - Argavand - Margara
 Հ16 Metsamor - Metsamor NPP - Aknalich
 Հ17 Armavir - Myasnikyan - Karakert
 Հ18 Hushakert - Vanand
 Հ19 Ashtarak - Oshakan - Dasht
 Հ20 Oshakan  - Agarak ( - Tegher) - Byurakan - ( - Amberd) - Lake Kari

21 to 30
 Հ21 Shirakavan - Horom - Artik - Alagyaz
 Հ22 Dsegh - Marts
 Հ23 Pushkino ( Tunnel bypass)
 Հ24 Gyulagarak - Kurtan - Dsegh
 Հ25 Haghpat
 Հ26 Conccurent with 
 Հ27 Meghradzor - Margahovit
 Հ28 Jrarat ( - Teghenis Sports Complex) - Meghradzor - Hankavan
 Հ29 Sevan - Tsaghkunk - Zovaber - Jrarat
 Հ30 Haghartsin  ( - Gosh)  - Chambarak ( -  Artsvashen) - Drakhtik

31 to 40
 Հ31 Vardaghbyur - Tashir
 Հ32 Gyumri - Kaps - Amasia - Tsoghamargh 
 Հ33 Stepanavan - Yaghdan - Mghart 
 Հ34 Stepanavan - Privolnoye - Akhkerpi
 Հ35 Sanahin - Odzun - Aygehat - Dzoragyugh
 Հ36 Ijevan - Navur - Berd - Aygepar
 Հ37 Aygehovit - Vazashen - Paravakar - Aygepar
 Հ38 Ttujur - Navur
 Հ39 Gavar
 Հ40 Areni - Khachik - Gnishik - Agarakadzor

41 to 50
 Հ41 Areni - Noravank
 Հ42 Vayk - Zaritap - Bardzruni
 Հ43 Artavan - Gndevaz - Jermuk - (/, Partially concurrent with de jure ) - Kalbajar - Qamishli
 Հ44 Artavan - Jermuk
 Հ45 Shaki - Sisian - Dastakert - Tsghuni
 Հ46 Goris ( - Goris Airport) - Tatev - Aghvani - Kapan
 Հ47 Tsav - Shishkert
 Հ48 Yeghegnadzor - Vernashen - Gladzor
Հ49 Nrnadzor - (/, concurrent with de jure ) - Aghband - Mincivan/Mijnavan - Shukurbeyli/Ishkhan - Marjali/Mardjan
 Հ50 Meghri - Meghri Airstrip - Agarak Copper and Molybdenum Mine

51 to 60
 Հ51 Teghut -Haghartsin Monastery
 Հ52 Yeghegnadzor - Malishka
 Հ53 Semyonovka - Tsovagyugh
 Հ54 Baghanis - Voskepar
 Հ55 Hrazdan - Tsaghkadzor Olympic Sports Complex ( - Tsaghkadzor ski resort)
 Հ56 Mughni - Ohanavan
 Հ57 Artashavan - Saghmosavan
 Հ58 Alaverdi - Jiliza
 Հ59 Petrovka - Sarchapet
 Հ60 Tashor - Metsavan - Dzyunashogh

61 to 70
 Հ61 Sarigyugh - Berkaber
 Հ62 Noyemberyan - Dovegh
 Հ63 Baghanis - Koti - Barekamavan
 Հ64 Berd - Norashen - Artsvaberd - Chinari
 Հ65 Norashen - Movses
 Հ66 Tavshut - Ardenis - Berdashen - Shaghik
 Հ67 Berdashen - Amasia
 Հ68 Vardaghbyur - Pokr Sariar - Saralanj
 Հ69 Artik - Harich
 Հ70 Marts - Atan

71 to 80
 Հ71 Lori Berd - Lori Berd Fortress
 Հ72 Shgharshik - Vahanavank
 Հ73 Dilijan - Lake Parz
 Հ74 Ishkhanasar - Sisian
 Հ75 Karakert - Bagravan - Isahakyan - Shirakavan - Gyumri
 Հ76 Aknalich - Taronik -Metsamor Castle
 Հ77 Vagharshapat
 Հ78 Sevan Island
 Հ79 Stepanavan Airport
 Հ80 Sisian Airstrip

81 to 85
 Հ81 Talin - Tsamakasar - Nor Artik - Bagravan
 Հ82 Meghri
 Հ83 Artik - Pemzashen - Dzorakap/Maralik
 Հ84 Sevan
 Հ85 Hrazdan

Highways of local importance
These roads are a level below H level roads, and connect main and regional highways to communities across the country. The letter by which these roads are numbered is "T", "Տ" in Armenian, standing for Տեղական, meaning Local.

International links
Armenia connects to European road networks via the International E-road network through various routes such as; European route E117, European route E691, European route E001 and European route E60. Armenia also connects to the Asian Highway Network through routes AH81, AH82 and AH83.

See also

International E-road network
Road signs in Armenia
Road Transport
Transport in Armenia
Transport in Europe

References

 
Transport in Armenia
Road transport in Europe